Narhar is an ancient village situated in Jhunjhunu district in Rajasthan, India.

References

History of Rajasthan
Villages in Jhunjhunu district